The SS Panzer Division was an SS formation during World War II. The table below shows the order of battle to which an SS Panzer division aspired.

The 12th SS Panzer Division "Hitlerjugend" was organized according to the above table, and served as a standard for all other SS panzer divisions during World War II. The average complement was approximately 19,000. However, only two out of seven SS panzer divisions contained that strength. In the second half of the war in Europe, in particular close to the end of war, some divisions achieved only the complement of regiment sized units.

See also
German heavy tank battalion 
List of Waffen-SS divisions
Panzer division

References 

 
Tables of Organisation and Equipment